Manuel "El Indio" Ledesma Barrales (12 August 1920 – 22 June 2001) was a Chilean basketball player. He competed in the men's tournament at the 1948 Summer Olympics.

References

External links

1920 births
2001 deaths
Chilean men's basketball players
Olympic basketball players of Chile
Basketball players at the 1948 Summer Olympics